This is a list of cricketers who have played matches for the Punjab University cricket team.

 Aftab Ahmed
 Ijaz Ahmed
 Imtiaz Ahmed
 Saeed Ahmed
 Shafiq Ahmed
 Shakoor Ahmed
 Waqar Ahmed
 Zulfiqar Ahmed
 Israr Ali
 Saleem Altaf
 Zafar Altaf
 Asad Jahangir
 Khalid Aziz
 Ehteshamuddin
 Humayun Farkhan
 Farooq Azeem
 Aftab Gul
 Waqar Hasan
 Mahmood Hussain
 Majid Khan
 Maqsood Ahmed
 Afzal Masood
 Asif Masood
 Masood Iqbal
 Khan Mohammad
 Nazar Mohammad
 Sarfraz Nawaz
 Mohammad Nazir
 Wasim Raja
 Sultan Rana
 Kamran Rasheed
 Fazal-ur-Rehman
 Shujauddin Butt
 Talat Ali
 Gulraiz Wali
 Agha Zahid

References 

Lists of Pakistani cricketers